The Brightcom Group is a digital marketing company founded in 2000 and headquartered in Hyderabad, India with offices in US, Argentina, Brazil, Chile, Uruguay, Mexico, UK, France, Germany, Sweden, Ukraine, Serbia, Israel, China, India, and Australia, and with representatives or partners in Poland, and Italy. It ranked 400th in the Fortune India 500 list in 2020.

History
Founded by Suresh Reddy and Vijay Kancharla as USAGreetings.com in September 1999, the company introduced its first eMarketing product 'Powered by USAGreetings' engine, in November 1999. In June 2000, the company metamorphosed into Ybrant Technologies Inc.
In September 2007, the company filed a Draft Red Herring Prospectus (DRHP) with the Securities and Exchange Board of India (SEBI). However, the company decided to put the IPO plans on hold.

In May 2008, Ybrant Technologies integrated all its acquired companies (Oridian, AdDynamix, MediosOne, and VoloMP) and formally changed its name to 'Ybrant Digital'. The reorganization of the company with the name change resulted in the formation of operational divisions Technology Platforms led by Vijay Kancharl and Strategic Initiatives led by Bradley N Cohen.

In December 2009, Ybrant added location-based advertising (LBA) to its services, entering into a partnership with Livevana Innovations & Lepton Software.

In February 2010, Ybrant Digital launched its local search platform in India 'Ybrant Reach' (YReach), starting in Hyderabad.

In August 2010, Ybrant Digital bought a search-based internet company Lycos.  At the time, Lycos was a top 25 Internet destination worldwide, reaching nearly 60 million unique visitors globally. The Lycos Network of sites and services includes Lycos.com, Tripod.com, Angelfire, Gamesville, and HotBot.

In May 2012, Ybrant Digital announced that it had agreed to purchase PriceGrabber, LowerMyBills, and ClassesUSA.com from Experian.  PriceGrabber provides price comparison shopping services to Yahoo! and MSN shopping. LowerMyBills.com offers savings through relationships with over 500 service providers, while ClassesUSA.com is an online higher-education portal. Steve Krenzer would move from Experian to Ybrant to continue to lead these three businesses. Ybrant expected the purchase to nearly double its revenues.

In September 2012, the purchase of PriceGrabber, LowerMyBills, and ClassesUSA.com from Experian fell through.

In March 2016, Ybrant Media Acquisition, Inc., a unit of Ybrant Digital, filed for chapter 11 bankruptcy protection in relation to a $36.6 million loss connected with the acquisition of the Lycos search engine. In 2018, Ybrant lost ownership of Lycos Inc.

In May 2018, Ybrant changed their name to Brightcom.

Acquisitions

References

External links 

Digital marketing companies of India
Indian companies established in 2000
Marketing companies established in 2000
Companies based in Hyderabad, India
2000 establishments in Andhra Pradesh
Companies listed on the Bombay Stock Exchange
Companies listed on the National Stock Exchange of India